Daviesia incrassata is a species of flowering plant in the family Fabaceae and is endemic to the south-west of Western Australia. It is an erect, mounded to spreading shrub with more or less zigzag branchlets, scattered needle-shaped phyllodes and orange, deep red and pink flowers.

Description

Taxonomy and naming
Daviesia incrassata was first formally described in 1808 by James Edward Smith in The Cyclopaedia from specimens collected at King George Sound by Archibald Menzies. The specific epithet (incrassata) means "flattened", referring to the phyllodes.

In 1995, Michael Crisp described three subspecies in Australian Systematic Botany and the names are accepted by the Australian Plant Census:
 Daviesia incrassata Sm. subsp. incrassata;
 Daviesia incrassata subsp. reversifolia Crisp is distinguished from the autonym by its tangled habit, zigzag branchlets and spreading to strongly down-turned phyllodes;
 Daviesia incrassata subsp. teres Crisp differs from the autonym and subsp. reversifolia by its needle-shaped branchlets and phyllodes that do not turn downwards.

Distribution and habitat
This daviesia is widespread in the south-west of Western Australia, from near Dongara in the north-west to the Cape Arid National Park in the south-east. Subspecies incrassata grows in heath, woodland and forest, in sandy or swampy places, subsp. reversifolia in heath in near-coastal areas between Bremer Bay and Esperance and subsp. teres in heath or near saltpans between Mullewa, Morawa, Mogumber Lake Grace and Kulin.

Conservation status
All three subspecies of D. incrassata are listed as "not threatened" by the Government of Western Australia Department of Biodiversity, Conservation and Attractions.

References

incrassata
Eudicots of Western Australia
Plants described in 1808
Taxa named by James Edward Smith